Schrörs is a surname. Notable people with the surname include:

Günter Schroers (born 1939), German Olympic rower
Heinrich Schrörs (1852–1928), German Catholic church historian